The Church of the Sacred Heart and St Catherine of Alexandria is a Catholic church situated in Droitwich Spa, Worcestershire, England, noted for its remarkable mosaics.

Walter Loveridge Hodgkinson was a main benefactor of the church. The architect was Frank Barry Peacock.  The building was listed at Grade II* on 11 December 2013.

The Mosaics
The mosaics at the Sacred Heart were designed by Gabriel Pippet (1880–1962) and carried out by Maurice Josey, assisted by Fred Oates. They were begun in 1921 and took 12 years to complete. Eight and a half tons of quarter-inch glass was imported from Venice for the purpose.  The influence of the mosaics of Ravenna is very apparent.  Indeed, Pippet travelled to Ravenna and Rome to study the mosaics before completing the designs.

References

External links
Sacred Heart Official site
Ravenna Influence in England
World's window on church's treasures

Church of the Sacred Heart and Saint Catherine of Alexandria
Droitwich Spa
Church of the Sacred Heart and Saint Catherine of Alexandria
Roman Catholic churches in Worcestershire